Dinedor Hill is situated 2.5 miles south of Hereford.  It is the site of Dinedor Camp, an Iron Age hillfort. More specifically a promontory fort. It is a Scheduled Monument first designated in 1928. It was occupied until late into the first century CE. Roman coins dating from 68-9 CE have been found there.

The hill has been a local visitor attraction since at least the late 19th century.

References

Further reading
Children, G; Nash, G (1994) Prehistoric Sites of Herefordshire Logaston Press

External links
Dinedor Camp at PastScape
Dinedor Camp Monument Detail

Hills of Herefordshire